The discography of Android Lust, an industrial rock band from United States, consists of 6 studio albums, 2 remix albums and 2 singles.

Demo albums
Foreign Body (1996)

Studio albums

Remix albums

Singles/EPs
The Want (2001, Dark Vision Media)
Dragonfly (2005, Project Records)

Other recordings
Ringworm v.1 - Cherished Agony (Last Drops) - Tinman Records
Awake the Machines 2 - Where Angels Lie (Writhing) - Out of Line Records
The Unquiet Grave - Heathen (A Thousand Thoughts) - Cleopatra Records
Empire One - Refuse, Where Angels Lie, Soviet (colder) - Tinman Records
Awake the Machines - Suffer the Flesh - Out of Line Records
Tentacles of Submission - No Going Back - Psykoziz Records
Diva X Machina - Down - C.O.P. International
Projekt Sampler - 2005.1 - Sin - Projekt Records
doors & windows - Monstrum Sepsis - dsc (remix by shikhee) - WTII Records
NCIS: The Official TV Soundtrack - Hole Solution - CBS Records

Remixes

References

Discographies of American artists